The Executive Council of the Northwest Territories or cabinet consists of six Ministers and a Premier elected by the 19 members of the Legislative Assembly.

Ministers at present are as follows (current as of July 2021):

References

External links
 Official site